Carex nemurensis is a tussock-forming species of perennial sedge in the family Cyperaceae. It is native to Japan and eastern parts of Russia.

See also
List of Carex species

References

nemurensis
Taxa named by Adrien René Franchet
Plants described in 1895
Flora of Japan
Flora of Kamchatka Krai
Flora of the Kuril Islands
Flora of Sakhalin